Isoo is a village in Anantnag tehsils in Anantnag district in Jammu and Kashmir, India.

Demographics
Isoo village is located in Anantnag Tehsil of Anantnag district in Jammu & Kashmir. It is situated 17 km away from Anantnag, which is district headquarter of Isoo village.

The total geographical area of village is 119.8 hectares. Isoo has a total population of 1,955 peoples. There are about 301 houses in Isoo village. Achabal is nearest town to Isoo which is approximately 6 km away.

Transport

By Rail
Sadura Railway Station & Anantnag Railway Station are the very near by railway stations to Isoo. However ever Jammu Tawi Railway Station is major railway station  243 km near to Isoo.

References

Villages in Anantnag district